Wild gourd is a common name for several noncultivated plants in the family Cucurbitaceae and may refer to:

Wild growing forms of plants called gourds, particularly
Citrullus colocynthis, thought to be the wild gourd mentioned in the Bible
Cucurbita foetidissima, native to the southwestern United States and Mexico